Cheongha or Chungha may refer to:

 Chungha (singer), whose name is rendered as Cheong-ha in revised romanization of Korean
Cheongha-myeon, an administrative township division in Buk-gu, Pohang
Cheongha Bridge, a bridge on National Route 29 (South Korea) in North Jeolla Province
Several intersections and interchanges in the South Korean highway system:
Two intersections of National Route 7 (South Korea) near Cheongha-myeon
An under construction interchange of the Donghae Expressway with National Route 7
An intersection of National Route 43 (South Korea) in Gangwon Province
 Cheongha, a brand of Cheongju from the South Korean company Lotte Chilsung